Angela Stahnke-Hauck (born 2 October 1965) is a German speed skater who has won many titles. She also competed for the SC Dynamo Berlin / Sportvereinigung (SV) Dynamo. She is married with handball-player Stephan Hauck and competed at three Winter Olympics.

References

1965 births
Living people
German female speed skaters
Speed skaters at the 1988 Winter Olympics
Speed skaters at the 1992 Winter Olympics
Speed skaters at the 1994 Winter Olympics
Olympic speed skaters of East Germany
Speed skaters from Berlin
Olympic speed skaters of Germany
20th-century German women